Oskar Piloty  (30 April 1866 – 6 October 1915) was a German chemist.

Life
Oskar Piloty was born the son of the painter Karl von Piloty in Munich. Due to the closeness of the Piloty family to the chemist Ludwig Knorr, who later married the sister of Oskar Piloty, he started studying chemistry at Adolf von Baeyer's laboratory at the University of Munich in 1888. After failing an exam by Bayer in 1889 he transferred to the University of Würzburg. He and his colleagues speculated that he failed because he fell in love with the daughter of Baeyer; Piloty married her in 1892.

At the University of Würzburg he worked with Emil Fischer on the chemistry of sugars, receiving his PhD in 1890.  In 1891, they published the preparation of a novel unnatural sugar, -ribose, by the epimerisation of -arabonic acid and reduction of the resulting lactone.  It was not until work by Phoebus Levene and Walter Jacobs in 1909 that it was recognised that -ribose is a natural product, the enantiomer of Fischer and Piloty's product, and an essential component of nucleic acids. In 1892, he followed Fischer to the University of Berlin where he worked until his father-in-law offered him a position at the University of Munich in 1900.  He accepted the position despite having a better offer from Fischer. He worked on the structure of natural products such as hemoglobin.  Piloty's acid is named after him.

Although he was too old to be drafted for World War I, he fought at the Western Front where he was killed during a fight at the Second Battle of Champagne in 1915 near Sommepy.

References

1866 births
1915 deaths
20th-century German chemists
Scientists from Munich
Ludwig Maximilian University of Munich alumni
University of Würzburg alumni
Academic staff of the Humboldt University of Berlin
Academic staff of the Ludwig Maximilian University of Munich
German military personnel killed in World War I
People from the Kingdom of Bavaria
Military personnel of Bavaria
19th-century German chemists